August Busch may refer to:

August Anheuser Busch, Sr. (1865–1934), 2nd generation brewing magnate
Gussie Busch, August A. "Gussie" Busch, Jr., (1899–1989), 3rd generation brewing magnate
August Busch III (born 1937), 4th generation brewing magnate
August Busch IV (born 1964), 5th generation brewing magnate

See also
Busch (disambiguation)
 Clemens Busch (Clemens August Busch, 1834–1895), German diplomat